

Molluscs

Bivalves

Dinosaurs

Newly named dinosaurs

Pterosaurs

New taxa

Synapsids

Non-mammalian

Paleontologists
 Death of the Reverend William Fox a significant early collector of dinosaur fossils from the Isle of Wight.

References